Ankita Makwana is a Swiss actress and model. She made her acting debut with the Bollywood thriller film Fever. She is founder of two film production companies, Rebelmango and Am films.

Early life
Makwana is daughter of the Honorary Consul-General of India to Zurich and State of the Vatican City J.H. Makwana. She grew up in Zurich and lived in Geneva, Paris and Mumbai. She studied Bachelor of Arts in Law and Economics at the University of St. Gallen in Switzerland.

Career
In her childhood Makwana hosted one episode of TV Show Euro Zindagi on Zee TV UK. Before acting in movies, she took formal training at the Kishore Namit Kapoor's Acting Lab in Mumbai in 2010. After that she started with small movies and ad films for companies like Ford Ikon or Universal Mobile where she shared screen space with renowned Bollywood actor R. Madhavan. She appeared in a friendly appearance in Sanjay Gadhvi's film Kidnap as Tisha. She has been a cover model for the Swiss women's magazine Annabelle. She has also modelled for 495dm and other brands. She was featured in the WW Who is Who Zurich 2014 magazine, and several other Swiss-German papers as such 20 Minuten and Schweizer Illustrierte. According to the media Makwana is also writing a script for a Bollywood movie which will be produced in Switzerland. In October 2013 Makwana was invited as a motivational speaker at the TEDx conference in Zurich Makwana is also producing, writing, directing and acting in the sitcom Zurich 8001. Zurich 8001 is the first international and English speaking sitcom to be shot entirely in Zurich, Switzerland.

Filmography

References

External links

 

Year of birth missing (living people)
Living people
Actors from Zürich
Swiss film actresses
Swiss television actresses
Swiss female models
Swiss motivational speakers
Swiss people of Indian descent
Actresses of Indian descent
Swiss expatriates in India
Actresses in Hindi cinema
European actresses in India
University of St. Gallen alumni
21st-century Swiss actresses